Kévin Ledanois (born 13 July 1993) is a French professional road cyclist, who currently rides for UCI ProTeam . He is the son of the former French cyclist Yvon Ledanois.

On September 25, 2015, he won the under-23 road race at the 2015 UCI Road World Championships held in Richmond, Virginia. In July 2018, he was named in the start list for the Tour de France.

Major results

2014
 1st Tour du Jura
 6th Overall Arctic Race of Norway
 6th Overall Tour de Normandie
2015
 1st  Road race, UCI Under-23 Road World Championships
 4th Paris–Camembert
 9th Tro-Bro Léon
 10th Road race, European Games
2016
 3rd Classic Loire Atlantique
2017
 9th Overall Tour de l'Ain
 10th Polynormande
2018
 Tour de France
Held  after Stage 1
2019
 7th Tour de Vendée
2020 
 4th Overall Tour du Limousin
 7th Prueba Villafranca de Ordizia
2021
 8th Trofeo Calvia

Grand Tour general classification results timeline

References

External links

 

1993 births
Living people
French male cyclists
Sportspeople from Seine-Saint-Denis
Cyclists at the 2015 European Games
European Games competitors for France
Cyclists from Île-de-France